A list of Bangladeshi films released in 1992.

Releases

See also

1992 in Bangladesh
List of Bangladeshi films of 1993
List of Bangladeshi films
Cinema of Bangladesh
Dhallywood

References

Film
Bangladesh
 1992